Colin James Clark (born 20 May 1969) is a Scottish politician who served as the Member of Parliament (MP) for Gordon from 2017 to 2019. He is a member of the Scottish Conservatives.

Early life
Clark was educated at Turriff Academy, a comprehensive school and Heriot-Watt University. He worked in business and agriculture until his election to the House of Commons.

Political career

During the 2015 election campaign, Clark's Scottish National Party (SNP) opponent in Gordon, Alex Salmond, recorded in his diary: "The Tory candidate, Colin Clark, cuts an impressive figure but his politics are far too dry for this area. If the constituency were composed entirely of michty fairmers then he might be the ideal candidate. But it isn't and he is not."

Clark then contested the East Aberdeenshire constituency at the 2016 Holyrood elections, and finished second to the SNP's Gillian Martin with a 29% share of the vote. Clark was elected to Aberdeenshire Council in a 2016 by-election and re-elected in May 2017, shortly before the 2017 snap general election at which he was elected as the MP for Gordon with a majority of 2,607 votes over Alex Salmond of the SNP, a former First Minister of Scotland.

In January 2019, he was appointed Parliamentary Private Secretary (PPS) to the Department for Work and Pensions (DWP). He also sat on the Environment, Food and Rural Affairs Backbench Committee. On 27 July 2019, he was appointed Parliamentary Under-Secretary of State for Scotland and a Lord Commissioner of the Treasury in the first Johnson ministry.

Clark was unseated at the 2019 United Kingdom general election by the SNP candidate Richard Thomson by a narrow majority of 819 votes.

Later career
Clark was blocked by Ruth Davidson from standing at the 2021 Scottish Parliament election.

References

External links

1968 births
Living people
Alumni of Heriot-Watt University
People educated at Turriff Academy
Politicians from Aberdeen
Scottish Conservative Party MPs
Scottish farmers
UK MPs 2017–2019